Francisco Callejón Segura (born 15 May 1998) is a Spanish footballer who plays for Betis Deportivo Balompié. Mainly a central midfielder, he can also play as a central defender.

Club career
Born in Pujaire, Almería, Andalusia, Callejón joined UD Almería's youth setup in 2010, aged 12, from UDC Pavía. He made his senior debut with the B-team on 23 October 2016, starting in a 2–2 Tercera División away draw against CD El Palo.

Definitely promoted to the reserves in January 2017, Callejón scored his first senior goal on 15 January, netting the equalizer in a 1–1 draw at UD Ciudad de Torredonjimeno. On 9 April he made his first team debut, coming on as a second-half substitute for Kalu Uche in a 2–2 home draw against Real Zaragoza in the Segunda División championship.

On 5 May 2020, amidst the COVID-19 pandemic, Callejón renewed his contract with the club until 2023. On 10 September, however, he was loaned to Betis Deportivo Balompié for the 2020–21 campaign.

On 15 July 2021, Callejón signed a permanent five-year contract with the Verdiblancos.

References

External links

1998 births
Living people
Sportspeople from the Province of Almería
Spanish footballers
Footballers from Andalusia
Association football midfielders
Segunda División players
Primera Federación players
Segunda División B players
Tercera División players
UD Almería B players
UD Almería players
Betis Deportivo Balompié footballers